Marnier may refer to:

Grand Marnier, an orange flavored cognac
Alexandre Marnier-Lapostolle created Grand Marnier